Kymo, also called Koumeli, is an uninhabited Greek islet, in the Libyan Sea, close to the eastern coast of Crete. Administratively it lies within the Lefki municipality of Lasithi.

See also
List of islands of Greece

Landforms of Lasithi
Uninhabited islands of Crete
Islands of Greece